Estrellas del Aire (English: Air Stars) was a Mexican passenger airline. It was established in 1991 by Estrellas de Oro, to complement their existing bus routes throughout Mexico. It was notable for being one of the first airlines in the country to be fully owned by a bus company, similar to VivaAerobús today. The airline had a fleet of 2 second-hand Douglas DC-9-10 aircraft. In 1996, the Estrellas del Aire fleet and routes out of Mexico City were acquired by Aerolíneas Internacionales and it has not operated since.

Fleet

The aircraft operated by the Estrellas:

References

Airlines established in 1991
Airlines disestablished in 1996
Defunct airlines of Mexico
1991 establishments in Mexico
1996 disestablishments in Mexico